Letts and Lonsdale is a British educational publisher of revision guides under the Letts and Lonsdale brand names. The company is a subsidiary of HarperCollins, an international publisher owned by News Corporation, and is within the company's Collins Education division. The company previously published revision guides under the Letts Educational and Lonsdale SRG brands, while owned by Huveaux PLC. Huveaux also owned Leckie and Leckie, the leading publisher of revision guides in Scotland.

In addition to providing choice across a wide range of guides and workbooks at each level, Letts and Lonsdale also provides schools and homes with online revision products, including podcasts that students can download onto their iPod.

Revision support is also provided through publications that teach pupils effective study skills and other advice to help with test and exam preparation. In March 2010, Letts and Lonsdale, along with Leckie and Leckie, were sold by Huveaux PLC to HarperCollins. Both companies became part of Collins Education.

References

External links
 
 HarperCollins UK
 Collins Education

Book publishing companies of the United Kingdom

Publishing companies based in London
News Corporation subsidiaries